Luis Cabrera may refer to:

 Luis Cabrera Lobato (1876–1954), Mexican lawyer, politician and writer
 Luis Cabrera (baseball) (1919–1977), Puerto Rican baseball player
 Luis Mario Cabrera (born 1956), Argentine footballer
 José Luis Cabrera Cava (born 1982), aka "Cabrera", Spanish footballer
 Luis Angel Cabrera (born 1995), Venezuelan boxer
 Luis Cabrera (Chilean footballer) (born 1994), Chilean footballer